The 1973 NCAA Division I Men's Soccer Tournament was the fifteenth organized men's college soccer tournament by the National Collegiate Athletic Association, to determine the top Division I college soccer team in the United States. The Saint Louis Billikens won their tenth national title by defeating the UCLA Bruins for the second consecutive year in the championship game, 2–1 after one overtime period. The final match was played on January 4, 1974, in Miami, Florida, at the Miami Orange Bowl for the third straight year.

Starting in 1973, the NCAA changed its classification system and the former University Division became Division I. At the same time, the College Division split into Division II and Division III.

Tournament field

Final – Miami Orange Bowl, Miami, Florida

See also  
 1973 NCAA Division II Soccer Championship
 1973 NAIA Soccer Championship

References 

Championship
NCAA Division I Men's Soccer Tournament seasons
NCAA Division I Men's
NCAA Division I Men's Soccer Tournament
NCAA Division I Men's Soccer Tournament
Soccer in Florida